Fuzzy Mud is a 2015 novel written by children's author Louis Sachar. It is available across the United States, and even in France and Quebec, having been translated to French by Jean-François Ménard, under the title Chemins toxiques ("Toxic Paths").

Plot
Fifth grader Tamaya Dhilwaddi and seventh grader Marshall Walsh have been walking to and from school together for years. However, their routine is interrupted when Chad Hilligas, a bully Marshall knows, came to fight them. Since they don’t want to escalate the situation, Marshall and Tamaya take a shortcut home through the off-limits woods. Marshall and Tamaya then split up after getting lost to look for an escape route. Afterwards, Chad shows up and tries to attack Tamaya. Marshall tries to defend her, but gets caught by Chad in the process. To save Marshall, Tamaya grabs nearby mud and throws it in Chad’s face.

Meanwhile, excerpts from an investigation led by the Energy and Environment Commission of the American Senate are shown, on the topic of SunRay Farm and biolene, an environmentally-friendly alternative to petrolium, developed by Jonathan Fitzman and Dr. Mark Humbard, among others. 

The following day, Tamaya wakes up to discovering a rash from exposure to the mud. At school, that day, the principal announces the disappearance of Chad Hilligas, from which Tamaya quickly concludes that the missing kid must still be in the woods. She and Marshall both independently decide to remain silent on the subject, in order to keep each other out of trouble. 

On the next day, Tamaya's rash gets worse, wherefore she is taken to the nurse’s office. During her stay there, Tamaya realizes what happened to her hand should logically happen to Chad’s face. She therefore escapes from school during lunch break and goes into the woods, in the spot where she last saw him. Upon finding him, she finds out that the mud had rendered him almost completely blind. The two children then have an intimate discussion, which reveals why Chad acts mean to others.

When Marshall learns that Tamaya is missing, he also leaves to look for her in the woods. He finds Tamaya and Chad, who have become closer, and assists the group out of the woods; during which he almost immediately notices the rash, of which he has, too, become a victim. A search and rescue team finds the trio, exhausted, and takes them to a hospital.

Meantime, thanks to more excerpts from the investigation led by the Senate, it is understood that the mystery mud is in fact the result of an unforeseen mutation of the micro-organisms that biolene is composed of. Seeing the effects it can have on humans, Heath Cliff (the town where all this takes place) is put under quarantine, in order to restrain the condition from spreading. The reader also notices that without Chad, Tamaya and Marshall having brought attention to the issue, the mutated micro-organisms would have spread to humans, but one or two weeks later, when it would have been far too late to prevent its spreading. Meanwhile, Tamaya as a weird dream-she thinks it is-and it includes Mr Fitzman (Fitzy) she asks for a new school uniform and it arrives in the  mail. It wasn't a dream.

Eventually, inasmuch as the mutation does not allow the micro-organisms to survive in freezing temperatures, when winter begins, all the creatures die. As for the humans and animals already affected, a scientist by the name of Dr. Crumbly finds a cure. He finds, one day, that his pet turtle, despite exposure to the mud, does not show any symptoms. He therefore develops a vaccine composed of turtle enzymes, which proves effective and is given to more than sixty thousand humans and animals. 

The world continues using biolene, manufactured only in the States of New Mexico, Idaho and Michigan, all of which have harsh winters and lack of vegetation. The entire globe is grateful for Tamaya, to the extent that the rash is named Dhilwaddi's blistering urticaria.

Reception
Darienne Stewart from Common Sense Media rated the book four out of five stars. She praised the book’s characters as role models, but criticized it for what she thinks is a rushed ending. On BookTrust’s “17 books to make reading fun for your class” list, Fuzzy Mud was in seventh place. Fuzzy Mud appeared on Theschoolrun.com’s “Best books for ten year olds”. It was described as “intelligent, thought provoking and thrilling.” Marybeth Kozikowski from the School Library Journal describes the book as an exciting tale that blends horror with sober consideration of ethics and science.
Kirkus Reviews describes the book as “a quick meditation on the promise and dangers of modern science that came from an exciting story from school life, friends, and bullies.”

References

External links 
 Inspiration for Fuzzy Mud at Louis Sachar website

Novels by Louis Sachar